Several ships of the Swedish Navy have been named HSwMS Mjölner, named after Mjölnir, the hammer of Thor in Norse mythology:

  was a  launched in 1942 and decommissioned in 1966
  was a  launched in 1978 and decommissioned in 1995

Swedish Navy ship names